Elder is a Scottish surname with variant spellings.  Its oldest public record was found in 1066 AD in Edinburgh. People with the name Elder or its variants include:

Surname
 Aldamar Elder (1854–1951), American politician and businessman
 Alex Elder (born 1941), Northern Irish footballer
 Alexander Lang Elder (1815–1885), Australian pioneer and founder of Elders Limited in 1840
 Alexander Elder, co-founder of British 19th century publisher Smith, Elder & Co.
 Alfonso Elder (1898–1974), second president of North Carolina Central University
 Alison Elder, English cricket player
 Alistair Elder, New Zealand association football player
 Ann Elder (born 1942), American screenwriter
 Anne Elder (1918–1976), Australian poet.
 Brad Elder (born 1975), American professional golfer
 Brenda Elder, English actress
 Brian Elder, Michigan politician
 Bruce Elder (disambiguation)
 Bryce Elder (born 1999), American baseball player
 Callum Elder (born 1995), Australian professional footballer
 Charles Elder (1821–1851), English painter
 Chris Elder (born 1992), English rugby union player
 Christian Elder (1968–2007), American sports car and former NASCAR stock car driver
 Christine A. Elder, American diplomat
 Christopher Elder (born 1947), New Zealand diplomat
 Clarence Elder, British art director
 Claybourne Elder (born 1982), American actor
 Conway Elder (1880–1957), Justice of the Supreme Court of Missouri
 Corn Elder (born 1994), American football cornerback
 Dave Elder (disambiguation)
 David Elder, Clerk of the House of Representatives, Australian Federal Parliament (2014-2019)
 Dawn Elder, American composer, pianist, and music producer
 Don Elder, New Zealand engineer and businessman
 Donnie Elder, professional American football player
 Dorothy-Grace Elder (born 1942), Scottish journalist and politician
 Eddie Elder (born 1989), American football player
 Edward Elder (1812–1858), headmaster of Charterhouse School (from 1853)
 Ern Elder (1916–2007), Australia rules footballer
 Fred Elder, NASCAR Winston Cup Series race car owner
 George Elder (disambiguation)
 Glen Elder (born 1934), American sociologist
 Heinie Elder (1890–1958), Major League Baseball pitcher
 Hinemoa Elder, youth forensic psychiatrist from New Zealand
 Jack Elder (1885–1944),  Australian rules football umpire
 Jack Elder (politician) (born 1949), New Zealand politician
 Jack Elder (luger) (born 1941), USA Olympian Luge 
 Jake Elder (1936–2010), NASCAR Grand National/Winston Cup crew chief
 James Walter Elder (1882–1941), United States Representative for Louisiana (1913–1915)
 Janet Elder (1956–2017), author and news editor
 Jennifer Elder (born 1968), American author, illustrator, and assistant editor for the Collins Library
 Jim Elder (born 1934), Canadian equestrian
 Jim Elder (born 1950), Deputy Premier of Queensland (1998–2000)
 Jimmy Elder (born 1928), Scottish professional footballer
 John Elder (disambiguation)
 Josephine Elder (Olive Gwendoline Potter; 1895–1988), English children's author
 Josh Elder (born 1980), American journalist and comics writer
 Joycelyn Elders (born 1933), United States Surgeon General
 Judyann Elder (born 1948), American actress, director, and writer
 Larry Elder (born 1952), American broadcaster and talk show host
 Lauren Elder, American artist and designer
 Lauren Elder (born 1990), American sculptor
 Lee Elder (1934–2021), American professional golfer
 Lew Elder (1905–1971), Canadian cyclist
 Linda Elder, American educational psychologist
 Lonne Elder III (born 1927), American playwright and screenwriter
 Lorenzo W. Elder (1820–1892), Mayor of Hoboken (1863–1864)
 Mark Elder, (born 1947), English conductor
 Maurice Elder (1916–2011), American football and baseball coach
 Miriam Elder, American journalist
 Murray Elder, Baron Elder (born 1950), British Labour politician
 Nancy Elder (1915–1981), Scottish chess master
 Nathan Elder (born 1985), English semi-professional footballer
 Nelson Elder (born 1923), Norther Irish unionist politician
 Norman Elder (1939–2003), Canadian explorer and Olympic equestrian
 Norman Elder (botanist) (1896–1974), New Zealand electrical engineer, teacher and botanist
 Peter Percival Elder (1823–1914), Lieutenant Governor of Kansas (1871–1873)
 Philip Elder, Anglican Bishop of the Windward Islands (1986–1993)
 R. Bruce Elder (born 1947), Canadian filmmaker and critic
 Ray Elder (1942–2011), NASCAR Grand National and Winston Cup Series driver
 Raymond Elder (ca. 1962–1994), Northern Irish loyalist
 Robert Elder (disambiguation)
 Rupert Elder, English professional poker player
 Ruth Elder (1902–1977), American pilot and actress
 Samuel Sherer Elder (died 1885), battery commander in the famed U.S. Horse Artillery Brigade
 Sprouts Elder (1904–1957), American motorcycle speedway rider
 Steve Elder (born 1956), Executive Director of the Catholic Education Office Melbourne
 Suzanne Elder, Chicago community activist
 Thereasea Elder, first African American public health nurse in Charlotte, North Carolina
 Thomas Elder, 19th century businessman and philanthropist in South Australia
 Toby Elder (1934–2005), Australian rules footballer
 Troy Elder (born 1977), Australian field hockey striker and midfielder
 Verona Elder, (born 1953), English athlete
 Viviane Elder (born 1904), French aviator, driver and actress
 Walt Elder (born 1991), American rugby union player
 William Elder (disambiguation)

References

Scottish surnames
Surnames of Lowland Scottish origin